Rules derby (or Sheffield derby) is a football derby played in Sheffield, England between Sheffield F.C. and Hallam F.C. It was first played on 26 December 1860 and is the oldest football fixture in the world. The name refers to the fact that the fixture was originally played under the Sheffield Rules.

History
The first match was played at Hallam's home ground, Sandygate Road and resulted in a Sheffield victory by two goals to nil. The teams competed in the first ever football match at Bramall Lane.

The derby is currently not a regular fixture as Sheffield are currently in the NPL Division One South, while Hallam are in the NCEL Division 1, two tiers below, however, the teams do regularly meet in pre-season friendlies and occasionally local FA matches.  The last meeting between the two sides was a 3–2 win for Sheffield on 9 October 2012 in the Senior Cup at the Coach and Horses Ground, Dronfield.

References 

Sport in Sheffield
England football derbies
Hallam F.C.
Sheffield F.C.
Football in South Yorkshire